You and Me is a 2005 Chinese film by writer-director Ma Liwen. The film, shot on a shoe-string budget, tells the story of a young woman who moves into an apartment run by a tough elderly woman.  Their relationship, initially cold and hostile, soon develops into friendship over the course of four seasons.  The film premiered at numerous international festivals, notably the 2005 Tokyo International Film Festival (where it picked up an award for actress Jin Yaqin) and the 2006 Berlin International Film Festival. The film was produced through the China Film Group and the Beijing Film Studio.

Plot 
Xiaoma is a young woman who has recently moved to Beijing where she finds an apartment in an old courtyard apartment complex owned by Grandma, an elderly woman. Xiaoma and Grandma's relationship almost immediately becomes strained. After trying to tidy up the courtyard, Grandma insists that Xiaoma turn over her share of the profits. Tightfisted, the elderly landlady resists even allowing Xiaoma to install a telephone. At the same time the older woman becomes increasingly interested in Xiaoma's personal (and romantic) life. Grandma, for example, tries to pass off her grandson to the younger woman.  Annoyed, Xiaoma nevertheless is flattered at the older woman's concern.  Over the course of four seasons, Xiaoma begins to learn from her landlady of the old world that the modern city of Beijing has left behind, while Grandma begins to enjoy the youth and vitality of her tenant.  The two women become closer and eventually develop a deep friendship.

Production

Story 
The film's story is based in part on director Ma Liwen's own experiences upon moving from Jiangxi to Beijing in the 1990s.  Like the protagonist, Ma also moved into an old siheyuan style apartment owned by an elderly woman. Also like the film, Ma and her landlady initially clashed, though they eventually became friends. When her landlady died, Ma was filled with remorse leading eventually to her making You and Me.

Ma Liwen said this of her film:

Casting 
The two main leads, Gong Zhe as the young woman and Jin Yaqin as Grandma, were both first-time film actresses.  Gong, a photography student, was cast in the lead role after literally being "discovered" by the director outside the cafeteria at the China Central University of Fine Arts.  Gong, however, has stated that the film production was strictly a one-time diversion from her stated career goals of photography.

Jin Yaqin, meanwhile, was already 81 when the shoot first began.  While You and Me was her first feature film, she had a nearly sixty-year career in theater and Chinese opera behind her.

Cast 
Jin Yaqin as Grandma, the landlady of a decaying Beijing courtyard building.
Gong Zhe as Xiaoma, the young college student who moves into Grandma's building as a tenant.
Zhang Shufang as Grandma Yin
Luo Zhongxue as Grandson
Qiang Shuang as Daughter
Liu Zhengliang as Son-in-law
Sun Jie as the Boyfriend

Reception

Awards and nominations

References

External links 

You and Me at the Chinese Movie Database
You and Me from distributor Delphis Films

2005 films
2000s Mandarin-language films
2005 drama films
Films set in Beijing
Films directed by Ma Liwen
Chinese drama films